Virgil Finley Blueitt (March 18, 1896 – April 29, 1952) was an American Negro league third baseman in the 1910s.

A native of Bowling Green, Kentucky, Blueitt played for the Leland Giants in 1916. He died in Chicago, Illinois in 1952 at age 56.

References

External links
Baseball statistics and player information from Baseball-Reference Black Baseball Stats and Seamheads

1896 births
1952 deaths
Leland Giants players
20th-century African-American sportspeople